K. Krupadanam was the Indian President of the Protestant Andhra Evangelical Lutheran Church Society and served for a short period from 1961-1962.  His tenure was embroiled in a legal wrangle but ultimately the AELC Church Society won the case.

As part of the continuing dialogue between the newly formed Church of South India and the other Protestant Churches, Krupadanam along with William P. Peery were involved in the negotiations.

References

Further reading
 
 
 
 
 
 
 

Indian Lutherans
Indian Christian theologians
Telugu people
Christian clergy from Andhra Pradesh
20th-century Indian translators
Senate of Serampore College (University) alumni
Academic staff of the Senate of Serampore College (University)
Living people
Year of birth missing (living people)